Möckmühl is a town in the district of Heilbronn, Baden-Württemberg, Germany. It is situated on the river Jagst, 22 km northeast of Heilbronn.

Local council 

Elections in 2014:

 Free voters: 8 seats
 Citizen list/CDU: 6 seats
 Greens: 4 seats
 SPD: 4 seats

Personalities

Sons and daughters of the town
 Wilhelm Paret (1864-1938), priest and photographer
 Martin Schwab (born 1937), actor
 Gerit Kopietz (born 1963), author

Other persons related with Möckmühl 
 Emil Ege (1833-1893), member of Landtag 
 Yannick Mayer (born 1991), cyclist, lives since its birth in the hamlet Ernstein near Züttlingen and attended high school in Möckmühl

Twin towns — sister cities
Möckmühl is twinned with:

  Cherasco, Italy (2001)
  Piliscsaba, Hungary (2004)

References

Heilbronn (district)